The Cleveland Clippers were a Negro league baseball team in the minor United States League, based in Cleveland, Ohio in 1946. Composed mostly of former players on from the Great Lakes Naval Varsity team and local sandlot stars, the Clippers are credited with a 2–16 record in 18 league games. By July, the Clippers had folded and the remnants of the organization merged with the Brooklyn Brown Dodgers.

Roster

See also 
 United States League
Brooklyn Brown Dodgers

References 

Defunct baseball teams in Ohio
African-American history in Cleveland
Baseball teams in Cleveland
Negro league baseball teams
1946 establishments in Ohio
1946 disestablishments in Ohio